The 8th Central Committee of the Workers' Party of Korea was elected at the party's 8th Congress on 10 January 2021, and will sit until the convocation of the next party congress. In between party congresses and specially convened conferences the Central Committee is the highest decision-making institution in the WPK and North Korea. The Central Committee is not a permanent institution and delegates day-to-day work to the Presidium, the Politburo, the Secretariat, the Central Military Commission and the Central Auditing Commission. It convenes meetings, known as "Plenary Session of the [term] Central Committee", to discuss major policies. Only full members have the right to vote, but if a full member cannot attend a plenary session, the person's spot is taken over by an alternate. Plenary session can also be attended by non-members, such meetings are known as "Enlarged Plenary Session", to participate in the committee's discussions.

Plenums

Department directors

Members

Alternates

Changes (2021–26)

References

Citations

Sources
General
References for plenary sessions, apparatus heads, the Central Committee full- and alternate membership, Politburo membership, Presidium membership, secretaries, Central Military Commission members, membership in the Central Auditing Commission, offices an individual held, retirement, if the individual in question is military personnel, female, has been expelled, is currently under investigation or has retired:
 
 
 
 
 

Bibliography
 

8th Central Committee of the Workers' Party of Korea
2021 establishments in North Korea